This is a list of the National Register of Historic Places listings in Big Bend National Park.

This is intended to be a complete list of the properties and districts on the National Register of Historic Places in Big Bend National Park, Brewster County, Texas. There are six districts and three individual properties listed on the National Register within the park.

Current listings 

The publicly disclosed locations of National Register properties and districts may be seen in a mapping service provided.

|}

See also 

 National Register of Historic Places listings in Brewster County, Texas
 National Register of Historic Places listings in Texas

References

External links 

Big Bend National Park